May Mi Ko Ko (born May Zin Phyo 26 November 1992) is a Burmese television and film actress, singer, and writer. She gained popularity among audiences after starring in her role as Myaing in the MRTV-4 drama series Pyar Yay Aine; she won the Best Actress Award in Star Awards 2018 by this series.

Early life
May Mi Ko Ko was born on November 26, 1992 in Bhamo, Kachin State, Myanmar. She is youngest of three siblings. She attended at Bhamo school and moved to Yangon high school BEHS Thuwana.

Career
Before started acting career, she worked as a Model. In 2012, she competed for new cast in MRTV-4 Talent Management Centre and she was selected by Forever Group. In 2016, he starred in her debut comedy series Ko Lu Pyo alongside Phone Set Thwin, May Akari Htoo and Shwe Sin Wint Shein.

In 2017, she starred in drama series Hubris alongside Han Lin Thant and Hsaung Wutyee May. In 2018, she starred in drama series A Yake alongside Nat Khat, Hein Htet, May Myint Mo and Nan Sandar Hla Htun. In the same year, she starred in drama series Pyar Yay Aine as the character Myaing alongside Aung Yay Chan, Phone Shein Khant, Shin Mway La, Hein Min Thu and Myat Thu Thu and she gain popularity among the audiences. And she won Best TV Series Actress Award in Star Awards 2018 by this series.

In 2019, she starred in horror-drama series Late Pyar Hnaung Kyo alongside Hein Htet (actor), Mone and Thi Ha. In the same year, she starred in action series Tatiya Myaut Sone Mat alongside Hein Htet (actor) and Myat Thu Thu. In 2020, she starred in comedy-drama series G Hall Thu as the character Nyo Htwe alongside Hein Htet (actor).

Filmography

Films (Big Screen Movies)

Film (Video)

Television Series

Discography

Single
 A Lwan Pyay  (25.7.2020) 
 Yone Kyi Nay Mae Chit Chin (ft. KM)  (14.9.2020)
 A Nan Pan (ft. Kyaw Min Khant)  (26.11.2020)

Publications

Short Stories Collection
A Nan Ta Pwint Ei Kyein Sar  (8.8.2020)

Awards

References

External links

Living people
1992 births
21st-century Burmese actresses
People from Kachin State